The English Men's Curling Championship is the national men's curling championship for England. The championship decides which team of curlers is sent to the European Curling Championships (and the same year's World Curling Championships, if England qualifies) the following season.  It has been held annually since 1975. It is organized by the English Curling Association.

Past champions

See also
English Women's Curling Championship
English Mixed Doubles Curling Championship
English Mixed Curling Championship

References

Men

1975 establishments in England
Recurring sporting events established in 1975
National curling championships